Zhu Jing  (born 2 March 1978) is a Chinese women's international footballer who plays as a midfielder. She is a member of the China women's national football team. She was part of the team at the 1999 FIFA Women's World Cup.

References

1978 births
Living people
Chinese women's footballers
China women's international footballers
Place of birth missing (living people)
1999 FIFA Women's World Cup players
Women's association football midfielders